The Marsh skimmer, also known as tricolored marsh hawk, and slender blue skimmer, (Orthetrum luzonicum) is a species of dragonfly in the family Libellulidae. It is widespread in many Asian countries.

Description and habitat
It is a medium sized dragonfly with yellowish white face and blue eyes. Its thorax is yellowish green with some brown stripes. Its wings are transparent, including the base. Its abdomen is pruinosed with azure blue up to the last segments. In old adults, thorax will also get pruinosed, obscuring whole the marks. Females and young males are yellowish green. They breed in marshes and swampy areas in the plains.

See also 
 List of odonates of Sri Lanka
 List of odonates of India
 List of odonata of Kerala

References

 luzonicum.html World Dragonflies
 Animal diversity web
 Query Results
 Sri Lanka Biodiversity

Libellulidae
Insects described in 1868